GUF may refer to:

 Guf, the Treasury of Souls in Jewish mysticism
 Dhuwal language, native to Australia
 French Guiana (ISO 3166-1 alpha-3 country code)
 Guf (rapper) a Russian rapper
 Global union federation, an international federation of labor unions
 Grandes Unités Françaises, a  World War II reference work
 Gulfport station, in Mississippi, United States
 Jack Edwards Airport, in Gulf Shores, Alabama, United States
 Gruppo Universitario Fascista, the student wing of the National Fascist Party in Italy

See also 
 The Gufs, an American pop-rock band